Tigrioides fulveola is a moth in the family Erebidae. It was described by George Hampson in 1900. It is found in Kolkata and Sikkim in India.

References

Moths described in 1900
Lithosiina